is a Japanese judoka. He won the gold medal in the men's welterweight (–81kg) event at the 2019 Summer Universiade held in Naples, Italy.

In 2019, he also won one of the bronze medals in the men's –81kg event at the Asian-Pacific Judo Championships held in Fujairah, United Arab Emirates.

References

External links 
 

Living people
1998 births
Place of birth missing (living people)
Japanese male judoka
Universiade medalists in judo
Universiade gold medalists for Japan
Medalists at the 2019 Summer Universiade
20th-century Japanese people
21st-century Japanese people